, sometimes called Maikeru Takahashi, is a Japanese-born American professional basketball player who was considered in the mid-1990s to early 2000s one of the best players in Asia, a prolific scorer and rebounder, dominating the opposition through his athleticism and technique.

Biography

Takahashi was born in Kokubunji, Tokyo to Ikuko Takahashi, a Japanese woman who now works as a computer programmer in Missouri and American actor Willie Dorsey who died sometime before 1995. Michael moved to the United States when he was 2 years old, settling in Los Angeles where he started playing basketball in high school.  He is married and has two children. It was revealed that Takahashi has one younger brother, actor Jun Soejima.

Professional career

After playing in college for Cal State Northridge he moved to Japan after playing there in the Universiade. On arrival he adopted his mother's surname of Takahashi to integrate.

Takahashi joined Isuzu Motors of the Japan Basketball League for the 1995-1996 season and quickly established himself in Japanese basketball, winning the league title and being awarded rookie of the year and the first of many All-Star designations. From then on he would be a vital element of the team that won all but two titles until it withdrew from the league due to financial difficulties in 2002. 
 
Takahashi would later repeat that success at Toyota Alvark where he won the title a further three times before joining his current team the Aisin Seahorses. He won his ninth championship in his first year with the Aisin seahorses.

National team
Takahashi became a mainstay on the Japanese national team starting with the 1995 Asian Championship where he helped the team win a bronze medal. They would do better at the next edition losing the final to South Korea which qualified them for the FIBA World Championship for the first time in 31 years.

At the 1998 tournament in Athens they were eliminated at the group stage, losing all their games although Takahashi finished as his team's best scorer with 16.4 PPG.  After playing in the 1999 Asian Championship, the 2002 Asian Games  and the 2003 Asian Championship (missing the 2001 edition due to club interference) without repeating earlier successes, his distinguished international career ended.

References

1974 births
Living people
Akita Isuzu/Isuzu Motors Lynx/Giga Cats players
Alvark Tokyo players
American men's basketball players
Basketball players at the 2002 Asian Games
Cal State Northridge Matadors men's basketball players
Japanese men's basketball players
Japanese people of African-American descent
Niigata Albirex BB players
SeaHorses Mikawa players
Small forwards
Sportspeople from Tokyo Metropolis
People from Kokubunji, Tokyo
1998 FIBA World Championship players
Universiade medalists in basketball
Universiade silver medalists for Japan
Asian Games competitors for Japan
Medalists at the 1995 Summer Universiade